The 2011 Indian Super Cup was the 10th Indian Super Cup, an annual football match contested by the winners of the previous season's I-League and Federation Cup competitions. The match was between Salgaocar and East Bengal with East Bengal winning 9–8 on penalties. The match played at Ambedkar Stadium, New Delhi, on 18 October 2011.

Background
This was Salgaocar's third time playing in this match (they won the first two times) and fifth for East Bengal (they won it two times as well).

Match details

References

Indian Super Cup Finals
2011–12 in Indian football
East Bengal Club matches
Salgaocar FC matches